is a Japanese basketball player for Denso Iris and the Japanese national team. She competed at the 2020 Summer Olympics, winning a silver medal.

Personal life
Monica's mother is Japanese and her father is a Nigerian of Igbo descent. Her older brother Louis plays professional baseball for the Tohoku Rakuten Golden Eagles.

Career
She participated at the 2018 FIBA Women's Basketball World Cup.

References

External links

1999 births
Living people
Basketball players at the 2020 Summer Olympics
Basketball players from Tokyo
Japanese women's basketball players
Japanese people of Nigerian descent
Sportspeople of Nigerian descent
Olympic basketball players of Japan
Small forwards
Olympic medalists in basketball
Olympic silver medalists for Japan
Medalists at the 2020 Summer Olympics
21st-century Japanese women